Undera is a town in the Goulburn Valley region of northern Victoria, Australia.

History
In 1874, when the area came under farm-selection activity, a township was surveyed and named Undera, the Post Office opening on 24 August 1875.

It is thought that the name is derived from an Aboriginal word, most likely meaning fat. Before being named Undera, the area was known as Mundoona. A school was opened in 1876, and Catholic and Presbyterian churches were opened the following year.

The Undera district extends northwards to Undera North and a westerly bend of the Goulburn River. Whilst the township is in the Goulburn Valley irrigation area, the northern parts sustained a local timber industry until the 1940s, and are mixed grazing and agricultural.

Undera has a school (21 pupils, 1998), a church, a memorial hall, (1928), a large reserve with a motorcycle track and a tennis court. The town has an Australian Rules football team competing in the Kyabram & District Football League.

Undera is the home of the Undera Park Speedway, a  motorcycle speedway which has hosted numerous Australian Championships including the Australian Solo Championship, Australian Under-21 Championship, Australian Under-16 Championship, Australian Sidecar Championship, as well as the Victorian Solo, U/21, U/16 and Sidecar Championships. A one-off motor racing meeting was held on a circuit near the town on 30 May 1960. The circuit measured just 1.2 miles, and was only just usable, due to two weeks of heavy relentless rain.

Its census populations have been 95 (1911), 350 (1933) and 156 (1966).

References

External links

Towns in Victoria (Australia)
City of Greater Shepparton